Mantidactylus tricinctus is a species of frog in the family Mantellidae.

Distribution and Habitat
This species is endemic to Madagascar. It is found between 450 and 850 m elevation at three sites in the east and southeast of the island, An'Ala, Befotaka and Vondrozo. Its natural habitats are subtropical or tropical moist lowland forests, rivers, and swamps. It is threatened by habitat loss.

Description
Mantidactylus tricinctus measures 17 to 19 mm long. Its back is brown with darker blotches. The species is characterized by a yellow patch on the groin and a white one at the tip of the snout.

Original Publication
 Guibé, 1947 : Trois Gephyromantis nouveaux de Madagascar (Batraciens). Bulletin du Muséum national d'histoire naturelle 2 (19): 151–155.

External links
Amphibian Species of the World: 

AmphibiaWeb: 

Photograph on CalPhotos:

Sources

tricinctus
Endemic frogs of Madagascar
Amphibians described in 1947
Taxa named by Jean Marius René Guibé
Taxonomy articles created by Polbot